The men's K-2 10000 metres was a competition in canoeing at the 1956 Summer Olympics. The K-2 event is raced by two-man canoe sprint kayaks. This would the last time this event was held in the Summer Olympics though it would be held at the ICF Canoe Sprint World Championships from 1938 to 1993.

Medalists

Final
The final took place November 30.

References

1956 Summer Olympics official report. p. 403.
International Canoe Federation historical results to 2006 (Olympic and world for all disciplines).
Sports-reference.com 1956 K-2 10000 m results 

Men's K-2 10000
Men's events at the 1956 Summer Olympics